Adria oil pipeline (/Јадрански нафтовод; also known as Yugoslav Pipeline and JANAF pipeline) is a crude oil pipeline in Croatia, Serbia, and Hungary with branch lines to Slovenia and Bosnia and Herzegovina.

History
The idea of the Adria pipeline was first discussed in 1964 by Yugoslav officials. The plan proposed in October 1965 foresaw a pipeline with a capacity of about 10 million tonnes per annum to supply Yugoslav refineries in Croatia, Bosnia and Herzegovina, and Vojvodina in Serbia with a branch line to the Hungarian border or through Ljubljana to Graz in Austria. The project foresaw to supply refineries in Sisak, Lendava, Bosanski Brod, Novi Sad and Pančevo. The annual capacity of the Bakar-Sisak section was scheduled to 17 million tonnes. A completion date for the Bosanski Brod-Vukovar section was set on 1 May 1968. In addition, a branch from Bosanski Brod to the Danubian port of Pančevo near Belgrade was foreseen. This proposal was supported Croatian authorities and INA oil company.

In 1966, Czechoslovakia offered to participate in the construction of the northern branch of Adria pipeline by supplying pipes and equipment. This offer was accepted in July 1967. Early in June 1967, preliminary talks began between Yugoslav and Austrian experts about a Bakar-Vienna pipeline (via Hungary) with a total annual capacity of 22 million tonnes. Another proposal was about an extension of the planned Yugoslav-Hungarian section to Austria. At the same time, construction of the eastern branch from Bosanski Brod to Vukovar started. 

In 1968, the route from Bakar through Hungary to Bratislava was decided. On 7 May 1968, Czechoslovakia signed a memorandum with Iran called for the supply of 15 to 20 million tonnes over a 10 year period, beginning in 1970. By August 1968 an agreement between the Yugoslav, Hungarian and Czechoslovak participants was reached on the joint construction of the Bakar-Sisak-Hungary pipeline. A joint enterprise was to be created for the construction and operation of the pipeline. The pipeline was to go into operation early in 1971.

At the end of 1968, Austria become tied into the Trieste-Ingolstadt pipeline and lost its interest to the Adria pipeline. Hungary, Czechoslovakia and Poland became more interested about the expansion of Druzhba pipeline and construction of the Trieste-Vienna-Budapest pipeline.  Also disagreement between the Yugoslav companies rose as HENA and Energoinvest preferred the Ploče-Sarajevo-Bosanski Brod route. 

In 1968, a dispute was raised concerning the quality of the large-diameter pipes delivered by Czechoslovakia for the eastern branch of the pipeline. Yugoslav partners claimed that these pipes were not calibrated on the ends according to API specifications. In addition handling with improper loading equipment and shipment between Bratislava and Osijek on improperly adapted ships resulted in damage to many pipe-ends, which meant that welding frequently could not be carried out on the site. This led to higher production costs. The Bosanski Brod–Vukovar section was put into trial operation on 29 April 1969.

In 1969, the Yugoslav oil company Naftagas (now Naftna Industrija Srbije), the Czechoslovak enterprise Hidrostav, and the United States engineering company Bechtel signed an agreement on joint engineering planning of the Adriatic link and the northern branch. In October 1969, it was agreed that the northern branch of Adria pipeline would be operational by the beginning of 1974. The total capacity was given as 17 million tonnes annually, with Yugoslavia receiving 10 million, Czechoslovakia 5 million and Hungary and Poland 2 million tonnes each. It was also agreed to extend the northern branch to Poland. 

In 1973, Yugoslavia's three biggest oil companies INA, Energoinvest and Naftagas agreed construction of the pipeline from Omišalj port near Rijeka to the main industrial centers around Zagreb and Belgrade with the northern branch of the pipeline to be connected with the Hungarian and Czechoslovak pipeline system, while the eastern branch to be connected with the Rumanian system. Each of the companies agreed to bear one third of the total costs. A joint committee (Jugoslavenski naftovod, later Jadranski naftovod) was established to managed construction and later the operation of the pipeline. The agreement between Yugoslavia, Hungary and Czechoslovakia was signed on 12 February 1974. The  pipeline was to be constructed in two phases. In the initial phase, expected to be completed by the end of 1976, all pipelines and oil pools were to be constructed at Omišalj, and in the second phase by 1978 all other installations and storage tanks were to be completed to enable the unloading capacity of 34  million tonnes of crude oil annually. At this stage, the pipeline was expected to cost US$350 million, of which Yugoslavia was to provide $30 million, and Hungary and Czechoslovakia $25 million each. The rest of the cost were expected to be financed by the World Bank loan.

In 1975, the expected cost was increased up to $412 million. A new financing scheme was agreed according to which Kuwait was to provide $125 million, Libya $70 million, the World Bank $49 million, Hungary and Czechoslovakia $25 million each, and Yugoslavia $118 million. Construction was scheduled to begin in the spring of 1976, and the first phase, was to be finished in 1978.

The construction of the Adria pipeline started in 1984 and it became fully operational at the end of 1989 (alternative sources cite 1990).  In 1991, as a result of the Croatian War of Independence and other Yugoslav wars, the operation of the Adria pipeline was  stopped and the facilities were mothballed and maintained in operational condition by the transit countries. The northern branch of Adria pipeline was re-opened at the end of 1995 and used since then occasionally mainly in reverse mode.

Description
The Adria pipeline starts at the Omišalj Oil Terminal. From Omišalj the main line runs to Sisak, while spur pipelines connects terminal and refinery in Urinj. In Sisak the northern and eastern branches are split. The norther branch runs further to Virje, where branch section runs to Lendava in Slovenia, and Gola, where the pipeline crosses Croatian–Hungarian border.  It continues through Hungary up to  the Duna refinery in Százhalombatta, where it is connected with the southern line of Druzhba and the Druzhba's branch between Hungary and Slovakia. The annual capacity of Hungarian section is 10 million tonnes of oil per annum.  The maximum rated capacity in the Slovak section is at 3.68 million tonnes per year.

The eastern branch runs from Sisak to Slavonski Brod. From there, the branch section runs to Bosanski Brod in Bosnia and Herzegovina, while the main line continues to Sotin at the Croatian–Serbian border. In Serbia, the pipeline runs to Novi Sad and further to Pančevo.

Further connections

The Druzhba Adria project suggested the connection of Adria pipeline with the Druzhba pipeline.  By this, Russia would have direct connection to the Omišalj harbor for its oil export. Due to objections for environmental reasons it was not yet realized. As an alternative, the combination of Druzhba Adria with the proposed Pan-European Pipeline has been suggested for transportation of Russian oil to Trieste. Adria pipeline is now connected with Druzhba pipeline in Šahy, Slovakia.

References 

Energy infrastructure completed in 1990
Oil pipelines in Croatia
Oil pipelines in Serbia
Oil pipelines in Hungary